Stacey McDougall (born 10 April 1990) is a Scottish international lawn and Indoor bowler.

Profile
McDougall lives in Woodburn, Dalkeith and plays for the Dalkeith BC (Outdoor) and Midlothian BC (Indoor). She started bowling in 1999 and works for the Royal Bank of Scotland.

Bowls career
McDougall made her senior international debut in 2012 (indoors) and 2013 (outdoors) and has won two senior National titles. In 2015 she won the fours gold medal at the Atlantic Bowls Championships and represented Scotland at the 2016 World Outdoor Bowls Championship – Women's Fours.

She was selected as part of the Scottish team for the 2018 Commonwealth Games, on the Gold Coast in Queensland that won a silver medal in the Triples with Kay Moran and Caroline Brown.

In 2019 she won the fours bronze medal at the Atlantic Bowls Championships and in 2020 she was selected for the 2020 World Outdoor Bowls Championship in Australia.

References

1990 births
Living people
Scottish female bowls players
Commonwealth Games silver medallists for Scotland
Commonwealth Games medallists in lawn bowls
Bowls players at the 2018 Commonwealth Games
Medallists at the 2018 Commonwealth Games